Grenagh GAA is a Gaelic Football and hurling club based in the village of Grenagh in Cork, Ireland. The club participates in Cork GAA competitions and in Muskerry board competitions. In 2010, the club played in the Premier division of the Cork Intermediate Football Championship and in Mid Cork Junior Hurling Championship. Their rivals are local side Whitechurch. Grenagh GAA club was established in 1934.

Achievements
 Cork Intermediate A Football Championship Winners (2) 2007, 2013
 Cork Junior Football Championship Runners-Up 2006
 Cork Junior Hurling Championship Winners (1) 2013  Runners-Up 1958, 2004
 Cork Minor B Hurling Championship Winners (1) 1997
 Cork Minor B Football Championship Winners (1) 1997
 Mid Cork Junior A Hurling Championship Winners (11) 1958, 1966, 1995, 1999, 2000, 2001, 2003, 2004, 2005, 2007, 2012, 2013  Runners-Up 1945, 1946, 1954, 1964, 1967, 2010, 2022
 Mid Cork Junior A Football Championship Winners (4) 1993, 2000, 2001, 2006  Runners-Up 2002, 2004, 2005

Notable players
 Tom Kenny
 Denis Murphy

References

Gaelic games clubs in County Cork
Gaelic football clubs in County Cork
Hurling clubs in County Cork